Naturism is a lifestyle and cultural movement advocating social nudity.

Naturism may also refer to:
 Naturalism (philosophy), the idea that only natural laws operate in the universe (see also Metaphysical naturalism)
 Nature worship, the religious and devotional practices that focus on natural phenomena
 , a late 19th-century French literary movement

See also 
 Naturalism (disambiguation)